Adrienne Evans is a British senior lecturer in Media and Communication for the Department of Media at Coventry University, and sits on the editorial board of the Journal of Gender Studies.

Education 

Adrienne Evans gained her Ph.D from the University of Bath.

Bibliography

Books 
 
 Evans, Adrienne; Riley, Sarah; Robson, Martine (2018). Postfeminism and Health. Abingdon, London: Routledge.

Chapters in books 
 Evans, Adrienne (2015), "Representing sex and celebrity.", in Attwood, Feona; Smith, Clarissa; McNair, Brian; Egan, R. Danielle, Routledge Companion to Media Sex and Sexuality. London: Routledge.
 Evans, Adrienne (2016), "The entrepreneurial practices of becoming a doll.", in Gill, Rosalind; Scharff, Christina; Elias, Ana Sofia, Aesthetic labour: rethinking beauty politics in neoliberalism. Houndmills, Basingstoke, Hampshire New York: Palgrave Macmillan.

Journal articles

References

External links 

 Profile page: Dr Adrienne Evans Coventry University

Year of birth missing (living people)
Living people
Academics of Coventry University
Alumni of the University of Bath
British mass media scholars